Diptayan Ghosh (born 10 August 1998) is a chess player from Kolkata, India. He was a student of the South Point High School, Kolkata. He qualified as a grandmaster at the age of 17 after achieving his third and final norm required for the title at the HDBank International Chess Open Tournament in Ho Chi Minh City, Vietnam in March 2016.

Ghosh won the gold medal at the Asian Youth Chess Championships in the Under 10 section in 2008 and the Under 12 in 2009.  He was a member of the gold medal-winning Indian team in the World Youth U-16 Chess Olympiad in 2013 and 2014.

References

External links

Diptayan Ghosh team chess record at Olimpbase.org

1998 births
Living people
Chess grandmasters
Indian chess players